The 2022 ASEAN Para Games, officially known as the 11th ASEAN Para Games, and commonly known as Surakarta 2022 (or Solo 2022), was a biannual multi-sport event for athletes with physical disabilities in Southeast Asia. It was held from 30 July to 6 August 2022 in Surakarta, Indonesia. All 11 countries in the region participated.

Originally set to be hosted by Vietnam in 2021, the Games were initially cancelled due to the COVID-19 pandemic just before its hosting rights were transferred to Indonesia. It is also originally scheduled from 23 to 30 July 2022, later moved to 30 July to 6 August 2022.

Development and preparation

Host selection
Originally the 2021 ASEAN Para Games was intended to be held in Vietnam, the same host nation as the 2021 Southeast Asian Games. The games were planned amidst the COVID-19 pandemic in Vietnam, posing logistical challenges in organizing the event.

Originally scheduled to be held from 17 to 23 December 2021, games were cancelled in October, as they planned after the 2021 SEA Games was postponed to May 2022 due to the pandemic. This would have been the second time Vietnam would have hosted the games, last staging them in 2003.

Malaysia and Indonesia expressed willingness to host the games as an alternative to its cancellation. The Philippines has supported moving the games to a country willing to host the games even if lesser number of events will be staged.

In January 2022, Surakarta in Indonesia and their neighbouring cities were announced as the host city for the games. However hosting rights could not be immediately awarded due to  World Anti-Doping Agency (WADA) sanctions in effect at the time. The hosting rights was only formally awarded to Indonesia on 16 February 2022 after the sanctions were lifted.

Venues
Almost all of the 2022 ASEAN Para Games held in Greater Solo (11 in Surakarta, 2 in Karanganyar). Originally, swimming also will be held in Karanganyar, but later moved to Semarang due to lack of preparation.

The Games

Participating nations
All 11 members of ASEAN Para Sports Federation (APSF) took part in the 2022 ASEAN Para Games.

 
 
  (Host)

Sports
The ASEAN Para Sports Federation in December 2021 agreed to organize events for 11 sports for the 2021 Para Games then scheduled to be hosted in Vietnam. CP football, cycling, sitting volleyball, and wheelchair basketball were proposed but were not added to the calendar due to "economic reasons and difficulties in preparing venues and facilities". When Indonesia was named new host, all but cycling were proposed to be held again.

Medal table

Notes

References

External links

ASEAN Para Games
International sports competitions hosted by Indonesia
Multi-sport events in Indonesia
Sports events postponed due to the COVID-19 pandemic
ASEAN Para Games 2022
ASEAN Para Games 2022
ASEAN Para Games 2022
ASEAN
ASEAN